Jon Macy is a gay American cartoonist. He began his career in 1990 with the series Tropo published September 1990 – April 1992 by Blackbird Comics. Since then, he has contributed to various LGBT comics anthologies and gay pornographic magazines, but he is best known for his graphic novel Teleny and Camille, which won a 2010 Lambda Literary Award for Gay Erotica.

Early life  
Jon Macy was born on September 11, 1964, in California.

Career 
Macy's first series Tropo was part of the early 1990s black and white alternative comics boom. It was followed by the erotic horror series Nefarismo published October 1994 – October 1995 by Eros Comix. These stories contained dark and surreal motifs, mixing eroticism with hallucination and death/rebirth, a common theme in Macy's personal works.

Throughout the 1990s, Macy contributed to queer comics anthologies, Meatmen and Gay Comics, and gay skin magazines, such as Steam by Scott O'Hara, Bunkhouse, and International Leatherman. His work on Meatmen included a short story entitled "Tail". Gilad Padva argues in his academic paper "Dreamboys, Meatmen and Werewolves: Visualizing Erotic Identities in All-male Comic Strips" (2005) that Macy's "Tail" eroticizes and politicizes Sigmund Freud’s homophobic myth of the Wolf Man.

After a hiatus of eight years, during which time he worked on his graphic novel Teleny and Camille, Macy began publishing again with an autobiographical story, "Crazy in Bed", published in Robert Kirby's anthology The Book of Boy Trouble, Vol. 2. He has since collaborated with various established and independent gay cartoonists, including Sina Evil and Justin Hall.

In 2010, Macy's Teleny and Camille was published by Northwest Press, a graphic adaptation of the classic anonymous erotic novel Teleny attributed to be a collaboration between Oscar Wilde and other writers he knew. Teleny and Camille then was awarded the 2010 Lambda Literary Award for Gay Erotica. An excerpt was featured in Teleny Revisited, a special issue of The Oscholars.

He produced the self-published comic book series Fearful Hunter (2010–2014), started as an act of protest against California's Proposition 8. After the first three issues were published, this title was picked up by Northwest Press who hosted a Kickstarter fundraiser in April 2014 to publish a compiled anthology including the final previously unpublished fourth issue. Fearful Hunter won the Prism Comics Queer Press Grant in 2010.

He has contributed to many anthologies including Justin Hall's No Straight Lines: Four Decades of Queer Comics and Robert Kirby's Qu33r. He was co-editor with Tara Madison Avery, of ALPHABET: the LGBTQAIU creators from Prism Comics.

Bibliography

Comics 

Tropo #1-8 (1991–1993, Blackbird Comics)
Nefarismo #1-8 (1994–1995, Eros Comix)
Meatmen #16-21 (1994–1998, Leyland Publications)
Gay Comics #23 and 25 "Personal ADventuring" and "Secret Self" (Bob Ross)
Wilde Magazine #1-3 "Garth" (1995 PDA Press)
Steam Vol. 1, Issue 3 - Vol. 3, issue 4 "Hot Water" (1994–1996, PDA Press)
Negative Burn #43 "Snow Cone", writer Aldyth Beltane (1997, Caliber Comics)
Titanium Lover webcomic (1997, Titan Media)
International Leatherman #25-30 "Midnight Sons" (1999–2000, Brushcreek Media)
Bunkhouse # 17-29 "Tailblazer" (1997–2000, Brushcreek Media)
Book of Boy Trouble Vol. 2 "Crazy in Bed" (2008, Green Candy Press)
Glamazonia "Rentboy Year One", writer Justin Hall (2010, Northwest Press) 
THREE #2 "Dragon", writer Sina Evil (2011, Robert Kirby)
Fearful Hunter #1-3 (2010–2012, Jon Macy)
New Years to Christmas: 15 Queer Holiday Tales "Happy Family Moment" (2012 Digital Fabulists) 
Gay City: Volume 5: Ghosts In Gaslight, Monsters In Steam "Paper Lantern" (2013 Minor Arcana Press and Gay City Health Project) 
No Straight Lines: Four Decades of Queer Comics "Teleny and Camille, excerpt" (2013 Fantagraphics) 
Qu33r "Obsessive Repulsive" (2013 Northwest Press) 
ALPHABET the LGBTQAIU creators from Prism Comics (2016, Stacked Deck Press) 
 RFD Number 165 Spring 2016 (RFD) 
 The Shirley Jackson Project edited by Robert Kirby (2016, Ninth Art Press)

Movies 

Fallen Angel DVD, interstice illustrations (1997, Titan Media)

Novels 

Teleny and Camille (2010, Northwest Press) 
 Fearful Hunter the complete epic (2014, Northwest Press)

Coloring Books 

 The Queer Heroes Coloring Book (2016, Stacked Deck Press)
 Butch Lesbians of the 20s 30s and 40s Coloring Book (2017)  Stacked Deck Press) 
 Butch Lesbians of the 50s 60s and 70s Coloring Book (2018)  Stacked Deck Press)

References

External links
 Northwest Press website
 Prism Comics website
 Stacked Deck Press website

American comics writers
Living people
LGBT comics creators
1964 births
American gay writers
Lambda Literary Award winners
American LGBT artists
American graphic novelists
American LGBT novelists
American male novelists